was a town located in Atetsu District, Okayama Prefecture, Japan.

As of 2003, the town had an estimated population of 2,511 and a density of 18.41 persons per km2. The total area was 136.37 km2.

On March 31, 2005, Shingō, along with the towns of Ōsa, Tessei and Tetta (all from Atetsu District), was merged into the expanded city of Niimi.

Dissolved municipalities of Okayama Prefecture